Kelso Cochrane (26 September 1926 – 17 May 1959) was an Antiguan expatriate to Britain whose unsolved murder led to racial tensions in London.

Life
Cochrane, who was born in Antigua, had a failed marriage while living in the United States; following this, he was deported back to Antigua on the grounds that he had stayed longer than allowed. He made the decision to move to England in 1954, arriving at the port of Plymouth before boarding a train to Paddington, London, where he made his home in the Notting Hill neighbourhood. He was a carpenter by trade and wanted to save enough money to go to law school.

Death
After fracturing his thumb in a work accident, he attended Paddington General Hospital. While walking home, shortly after midnight on 17 May 1959, the 32-year-old Cochrane was set upon at the junction of Golborne Road and Southam Street by a gang of white youths, who stabbed him with a stiletto knife. Three other men arrived on the scene, and the youths ran off. The three men took Cochrane to hospital, where he died an hour later.

His funeral procession on 6 June 1959, from St Michael and All Angels Church along Ladbroke Grove to Kensal Green Cemetery, was attended by more than 1,200 people.

Context
Notting Hill was at the time a stronghold for Oswald Mosley's Union Movement and Colin Jordan's White Defence League. The previous year, race riots had broken out in that area. The detective investigating the cases was initially convinced that the youths' motive was robbery, but Cochrane's lack of money was explained by his fiancée, as Cochrane himself had emptied his wallet that morning. Searchlight magazine claimed in 2006 that the police's public denial of any racist motive "was almost certainly a misguided attempt to ensure calm in the area".

Local Union Movement member Peter Dawson later claimed to the Sunday People that it had been a group member who was responsible for the murder. Mosley himself later held a public meeting on the spot where Cochrane had been murdered. Following the murder, the British Government organised an investigation into race relations, chaired by Amy Ashwood Garvey.

Witnesses were likely to have seen the incident; however, they were reluctant to report what they saw to the police because they were concerned about possible reprisals. Although the killers were well known in local circles, they were not named publicly until 2011 and no one was ever charged with the murder. The police were believed to have been complacent in their investigation and there were some accusations of a cover-up. His murder was emblematic of the racial tensions that existed at the time but also a desire to unite a community. In his 2013 memoir This Boy, Alan Johnson writes that his mother witnessed the prelude to the murder and recognised one of the gang. More than 1200 people attended Cochrane's funeral from all sections of the Notting Hill community, white and black. Following on from the murder, the Home Secretary launched a public inquiry into race relations

Aftermath
From 1959, activist Claudia Jones organised events to celebrate Caribbean culture "in the face of the hate from the white racists", which are seen as forerunners of the first Notting Hill Carnival in 1964.

A BBC Two television documentary broadcast on 8 April 2006 covered the first visit by Stanley Cochrane to England that year to try to find out more about his brother's death and ask for a police re-investigation. Steve Silver, who was in contact with the BBC researchers and wrote an article in Searchlight coinciding with the programme, later reported that he had heard from Kelso Cochrane's daughter in the U.S. and was able to put her in touch with her uncle.

Cochrane's murder is believed to have led to a decline in support for Oswald Mosley, who was planning a return to politics in the UK. Mosley polled under 3,000 votes in Kensington North in the general election in October.

In the wake of a 2021 petition by Cochrane's family demanding an apology for alleged failings in the investigation of the murder, the Metropolitan Police confirmed that it was assessing historical material in connection with the case.

Legacy
 
On Sunday, 17 May 2009, to mark the 50th anniversary of Cochrane's death, a blue plaque organised by the Nubian Jak Community Trust was unveiled at the Golborne Bar & Restaurant, now "Cha Cha x Sister Jane" (36 Golborne Road, London W10), just opposite the place where he was attacked.

See also
1958 Notting Hill race riots
List of unsolved murders in the United Kingdom

References

Other sources
 Mark Olden, Murder in Notting Hill, Zero Books (rpt 2011)

External links
Raphael Rowe, "Who killed Kelso Cochrane?", BBC News, 7 April 2006.
Frances Webber, "Fifty Years on - Remembering Kelso Cochrane", Institute of Race Relations, 21 May 2009.
Mark Olden's  blog on the Cochrane and Lawrence murders
Murad Qureshi, "The Killing of Kelso Cochrane", The Qureshi Report, 18 May 2009.
Diane Abbott, "The death of Kelso Cochrane", Operation Black Vote (OBV), 14 September 2011.

1950s murders in London
1959 in London
1959 murders in the United Kingdom
Anti-black racism in England
Black British history
Deaths by person in London
Deaths by stabbing in London
May 1959 events in the United Kingdom
Male murder victims
Racially motivated violence against black people
Racially motivated violence in England